"Free" is a song performed by English classical crossover soprano Sarah Brightman from her ninth studio album, Harem (2003). It was originally written in German by Matthias Meissner and Thomas Schwarz. The song was then re-written in English by Brightman in collaboration with Sophie B. Hawkins. The track was produced by Frank Peterson. It was released as the fourth and final single from Harem by Angel Records on 10 June 2003. The song contains prominent classical crossover and Middle Eastern pop musical characters. It is influenced by feelings of desperation and is lyrically about somebody who has lost somebody and is looking onto their relationship with somebody else.

"Free" reached the #3 position on the US Hot Dance Music/Club Play charts. Violinist Nigel Kennedy is featured in the last four stanzas of the song.

Music video
In Harem; a Desert Fantasy, Brightman stands in the middle of a pond surrounded by all the Arabian girls she sings to and in one part, she gives the white dove a lift in the air.

Track listing

Digital Single / USA Promotional CD Single
 "Free" (Swiss American Federation Hot AC Mix) 2:58
 "Free" (Swiss American Federation Modern AC Mix) 3:52
 "Free" (Album Version) 3:44

European Promotional CD Single
 "Free" (Swiss American Federation Hot AC Mix) 2:58
 "Free" (Swiss American Federation Modern AC Mix) 3:52
 "Free" (Album Version) 3:44
 "Guéri De Toi" (Nemo Mix) 3:15

DJ Vinyl
"Free" (Swiss American Federation Club Mix)
"Free" (Nemo Remix)
"Free" (Swiss American Federation Dub Mix)
"Guéri De Toi" (Nemo Remix)
This was a promo-only release.

References

External links

2004 singles
Sarah Brightman songs
2003 songs
Song recordings produced by Frank Peterson
Songs written by Sophie B. Hawkins